Connellia quelchii is a plant species in the genus Connellia. This species is endemic to Venezuela.

References

quelchii
Flora of Venezuela
Taxa named by N. E. Brown